Sarab or Sar Ab or Sar-e Ab or Sarab-e may refer to:

Afghanistan 
 Sarab, Baghlan Province
 Sarab, Ghazni Province

Iran

Alborz Province
 Sarab, Alborz

Chaharmahal and Bakhtiari Province
 Sarab-e Olya Rural District, Farsan County
 Sarab-e Sofla Rural District, Farsan County

East Azerbaijan Province
 Sarab, East Azerbaijan
 Sarab County

Fars Province
 Sarab-e Bahram, Mamasani County
 Sar Ab-e Gojestan, Mamasani County
 Sarab Rud, Mamasani County
 Sarab-e Siah, Rostam County

Hamadan Province
 Sarab, Hamadan, a village in Kabudarahang County
 Sarab Samen, a village in Malayer County
 Sarab-e Tajar, a village in Malayer County
 Sarab Rural District (Hamadan Province)

Hormozgan Province

Ilam Province
 Sarab, Ilam
 Sarab Bagh
 Sarab Gur-e Tuti
 Sarab-e Kalak
 Sarab-e Kalak, alternate name of Kalak-e Naqi
 Sarab-e Kalan
 Sarab-e Karzan
 Sarab-e Noql
 Sarab Rural District (Ilam Province)
 Sarab Bagh District
 Sarab Bagh Rural District

Isfahan Province
 Sarab, Isfahan, a village in Ardestan County

Kerman Province
 Sarab, Kerman, a village in Jiroft County
 Sarab, Shahr-e Babak, a village in Shahr-e Babak County

Kermanshah Province
 Sarab-e Harasam, a village in Eslamabad-e Gharb County
 Sarab-e Kulasah, a village in Eslamabad-e Gharb County
 Sarab-e Mileh Sar, a village in Eslamabad-e Gharb County
 Sarab-e Shahini, a village in Eslamabad-e Gharb County
 Sarab-e Shian, a village in Eslamabad-e Gharb County
 Sarab-e Shuhan, a village in Eslamabad-e Gharb County
 Sarab Khoman, a village in Eslamabad-e Gharb County
 Sarab, Gilan-e Gharb, a village in Gilan-e Gharb County
 Sarab Qanbar, a village in Gilan-e Gharb County
 Sar Ab-e Barnaj, a village in Harsin County
 Sarab Badiyeh-ye Olya, a village in Harsin County
 Sarab Badiyeh-ye Sofla, a village in Harsin County
 Sarab-e Bardeh Zanjir-e Olya, a village in Javanrud County
 Sarab-e Bardeh Zanjir-e Sofla, a village in Javanrud County
 Sarab Bas, a village in Javanrud County
 Sarab, Kangavar, a village in Kangavar County
 Sarab-e Baba Ali, a village in Kangavar County
 Sarab-e Dehlor, a village in Kangavar County
 Sarab-e Karian, a village in Kermanshah County
 Sarab Khoshkeh-ye Olya, a village in Kermanshah County
 Sarab Khoshkeh-ye Sofla, a village in Kermanshah County
 Sarab-e Nilufar, a village in Kermanshah County
 Sarab-e Sarin, a village in Kermanshah County
 Sarab-e Shah Hoseyn, a village in Kermanshah County
 Sarab-e Sheleh, a village in Kermanshah County
 Sarab-e Tiran, a village in Kermanshah County
 Sarab-e Garm Garab, a village in Ravansar County
 Sarab, Sahneh, a village in Sahneh County
 Sarab-e Qaleh Shahin, a village in Sarpol-e Zahab County
 Sarab-e Zehab, a village in Sarpol-e Zahab County
 Sarab-e Garm-e Olya, a village in Sarpol-e Zahab County
 Sarab-e Garm-e Sofla, a village in Sarpol-e Zahab County
 Sarab-e Surenabad, a village in Sonqor County
 Sarab Rural District (Kermanshah Province), in Sonqor County

Khuzestan Province
 Sar Ab, Khuzestan, a village in Izeh County
 Sarab-e Nargesi, a village in Masjed Soleyman County

Kohgiluyeh and Boyer-Ahmad Province
 Sarab Biz, a village in Basht County
 Sarab-e Khamzan-e Kuchek, a village in Boyer-Ahmad County
 Sarab-e Taveh, a village in Boyer-Ahmad County
 Sarab-e Mugarm, a village in Charam County
 Sarab-e Naniz, a village in Gachsaran County

Kurdistan Province
 Sarab, Kurdistan, a village in Bijar County
 Sarab-e Dowkal, a village in Dehgolan County
 Sarab-e Hajji Pamoq, a village in Dehgolan County
 Sarab-e Hajji Peymuq, a village in Dehgolan County
 Sarab-e Shahrak-e Olya, a village in Dehgolan County
 Sarab-e-Sureh, a village in Dehgolan County
 Sarab-e Mirza, a village in Divandarreh County
 Sarab-e Qarah Khan, a village in Divandarreh County
 Sarab-e Kam, a village in Kamyaran County
 Sarab-e Qaht, a village in Qorveh County
 Sarab-e Sheykh Hasan, a village in Qorveh County
 Sarab-e Bayanchqolu, a village in Sanandaj County
 Sarab Qamish, a village in Sanandaj County
 Sarab Qamish Rural District, in Sanandaj County

Razavi Khorasan Province
 Sarab, Khvaf
 Sarab, Quchan
 Sar Ab-e Kushk
 Sar Ab, Torbat-e Jam

Sistan and Baluchestan Province
 Sarab, Sistan and Baluchestan, a village in Iranshahr County

South Khorasan Province
 Sarab, Qaen
 Sarab, Sarayan
 Sarab-e Sofla

West Azerbaijan Province
 Sarab, Bukan, a village in Bukan County

Zanjan Province
 Sarab, Ijrud, a village in Ijrud County
 Sarab, alternate name of Shur Ab, Ijrud, a village in Ijrud County
 Sarab, Khodabandeh, a village in Khodabandeh County

Yemen
 Sarab, Yemen